Taktaharkány is a village in Borsod-Abaúj-Zemplén County in northeastern Hungary.

Sister cities 

  Attert (Belgium) since 2003

References

External links

  in Hungarian

Populated places in Borsod-Abaúj-Zemplén County